Enigma is a town in Berrien County, Georgia, United States. The population was 1,278 at the 2010 census. The origin of the name "Enigma" is obscure; the name is itself an enigma. Enigma has frequently been noted on lists of unusual place names.

History
The town was founded between 1876-1880 by John A. Ball. It was not initially named "Enigma". Originally a settlement, it was commonly referred to as "Gunn and Weston" until Ball decided he wanted a real name for this town. Two names, "Lax" and "Enigma", were proposed to state officials for review. Lax was already taken by another nearby settlement, and so "Enigma" became the official name. Enigma is an odd name for a town; by definition it means a puzzle or mystery. Ball said, "It was a puzzle what to name it anyway." The town was incorporated on August 21, 1906.

Ball and his family originated in Raleigh, North Carolina, traveling to Georgia on the Brunswick and Western Railroad. He became the town's first postmaster, and not long afterward, Capt J.B. Gunn from Terrell County, Georgia, came as an assistant. Ball and his son Jim started a turpentine business around 1878. Ball returned to Raleigh to bring back a man named Tubb Daughtry and his family to help run the business. He gave them land to live on and permission to worship as they pleased. The turpentine business soon dwindled, and lumber became the main focus. Capt. J. B. Gunn and Capt. S. R. Weston built a sawmill two miles east of Enigma. H. F. Stewart came to work in the sawmill.

Other businesses opened in Enigma throughout the years, including a grocery, merchandise, and hardware stores. E.F. Bussey set up a merchandise store in a building owned at one time by Gunn. This building also housed the U.S. Post Office and sold coffins on its second story. It was located on the south side of the railroad. Enigma had a doctor's office run by G.R. Parker. There have been three banks in Enigma throughout the years. Two banks were started around 1915 to 1917, and the other one was started in 1973. The People's Bank opened in 1915 and closed in 1916, and the Ambrose-Enigma Banking Company opened on June 5, 1917, and closed around 1920. The Bank of Alapaha opened a branch in Enigma on March 1, 1973, and is still in business.

Geography

Demographics

As of the census of 2000, there were 869 people, 313 households, and 231 families residing in the town. The racial makeup of the town was 77.79% White, 10.36% African American, 0.12% Asian, 0.92% Pacific Islander, 9.32% from other races, and 1.50% from two or more races. Hispanic or Latino of any race were 11.85% of the population.

There were 313 households, out of which 43.5% had children under the age of 18 living with them, 55.6% were married couples living together, 13.7% had a female householder with no husband present, and 25.9% were non-families. 23.0% of all households were made up of individuals, and 10.2% had someone living alone who was 65 years of age or older.  The average household size was 2.78 and the average family size was 3.24.

In the town, the population was spread out, with 35.4% under the age of 18, 7.5% from 18 to 24, 30.0% from 25 to 44, 18.4% from 45 to 64, and 8.6% who were 65 years of age or older.  The median age was 29 years. For every 100 females, there were 97.5 males.  For every 100 females age 18 and over, there were 85.1 males.

The median income for a household in the town was $25,268, and the median income for a family was $27,375. Males had a median income of $22,202 versus $16,964 for females. The per capita income for the town was $14,498.  About 20.9% of families and 24.2% of the population were below the poverty line, including 30.4% of those under age 18 and 19.5% of those age 65 or over.

Annual events

The park holds the town's annual Fourth of July celebration, consisting of vendors, exhibits and the Miss Enigma Firecracker Pageant, each year. The town also hosts a Halloween Trick or Treat and a Christmas Parade each year.

Churches
Churches in the Enigma community include:
 St. Stephen's Missionary Baptist Church.
 Mount Zion Holiness Baptist Church, organized in 1921.
 The Christian Church, established in 1908.  It was torn down and rebuilt in 1946, and an education annex was added in 1960.
 Enigma Baptist Church, established in 1889 as Enigma Missionary Baptist Church. It joined the Mell Baptist Association shortly after both began and is still part of the association. In the 1910s the church was destroyed by a tornado, leaving only the pulpit and a chair on the podium.
 Enigma Methodist Church, established in 1886, and designed by Canadian architect John C. Gubesm.
 Pine Ridge Missionary Church, established in 1962, is part of the Smyrna Missionary Baptist Association.
 Harvest Time Christian Outreach.

Education
The Enigma school was located on the north side of town. It started as a one-room school house, then moved to a three-room school house. A large brick building was built in 1926 to serve as a new school, also on the north side, just across from Highway 82. In the fall of 1954 all county high schools were consolidated into Berrien High in Nashville, the county seat. The original Enigma school building was still in use as part of the elementary school when it burned in October 1973. The gymnasium and cafeteria were still standing, and portable classrooms were brought in so the school could continue until it was rebuilt.  Enigma Elementary School was never rebuilt, and the mobile units continued serving the school until it closed at the end of the 1987-88 school year. Enigma Elementary merged with West Berrien Elementary School starting with the 1988-89 school year.  The new Northwest Elementary School was housed on the old West Berrien campus.  Northwest Elementary School was closed in 1994 in the final consolidation of schools in the county.  Now all children are bussed to Berrien Primary, Berrien Elementary, Berrien Middle, and Berrien High in Nashville. The Enigma School grounds now serve as the Enigma City Park.

References

External links
 Berrien County Historical Photos Collection
 Berrien County Board of Education

Towns in Berrien County, Georgia
Towns in Georgia (U.S. state)